Robert Aubin (born May 26, 1960) is a Canadian politician who served as the Member of Parliament for the riding of Trois-Rivières from 2011 to 2019 as a member of the New Democratic Party.

Background and education

Born in Trois-Rivières, Quebec, Aubin has a diploma in geography from Université Laval and a degree in music and education from the Université du Québec à Trois-Rivières.

At the time of his election, he had been a teacher at the Séminaire St-Joseph for nearly 25 years. He has also been a musician.

Political career

Aubin was elected to the House of Commons of Canada in the 2011 election and he was re-elected in 2015. After the 2015 election, Aubin was appointed the NDP critic for International development and La Francophonie in the 42nd Canadian Parliament.

Aubin lost his seat in the 2019 federal election.

Electoral record

References

External links
 Robert Aubin
 

1960 births
French Quebecers
Living people
Members of the House of Commons of Canada from Quebec
New Democratic Party MPs
Université Laval alumni
Université du Québec à Trois-Rivières alumni
Canadian schoolteachers
Musicians from Trois-Rivières
21st-century Canadian politicians